This is a list of people executed in the United States in 2015. Twenty-eight people were executed in the United States in 2015. Thirteen of them were in the state of Texas. One (Alfredo Rolando Prieto) was a foreign national from El Salvador. One (Kelly Renee Gissendaner) was female.

While there was a total of 28 executions in 2015, there were 35 executions in the previous year (2014) and 20 executions in the subsequent year (2016).

List of people executed in the United States in 2015

Demographics

Executions in recent years

See also
 List of death row inmates in the United States
 List of juveniles executed in the United States since 1976
 List of most recent executions by jurisdiction
 List of people scheduled to be executed in the United States
 List of women executed in the United States since 1976

References

List of people executed in the United States
People executed in the United States
Executions
2015